Nossa Senhora de Fátima, Portuguese for Our Lady of Fátima, may refer to:

 Nossa Senhora de Fátima (Lisbon), former parish of Lisbon, Portugal
 Nossa Senhora de Fátima, Macau, freguesia in Macau
 Nossa Senhora de Fátima, Santa Maria, bairro in Santa Maria, Rio Grande do Sul, Brazil